The Ohio Turnpike, officially the James W. Shocknessy Ohio Turnpike, is a  limited-access toll highway in the U.S. state of Ohio, serving as a primary corridor between Chicago and Pittsburgh. The road runs east–west in the northern section of the state, with the western end at the Indiana–Ohio border near Edon where it meets the Indiana Toll Road, and the eastern end at the Ohio–Pennsylvania border near Petersburg, where it meets the Pennsylvania Turnpike. The road is owned and maintained by the Ohio Turnpike and Infrastructure Commission (OTIC), headquartered in Berea.

Built from 1949 to 1955, construction for the roadway was completed a year prior to the Interstate Highway System. The modern Ohio Turnpike is signed as three Interstate numbers: I-76, I-80, and I-90.

Route description  
Most of the turnpike,  between the Indiana border and an interchange with Interstate 76 (I-76) near Youngstown, is signed as part of I-80, while the eastern , between the I-80/I-76 interchange and the Pennsylvania border, is signed as part of I-76. For , between the Indiana border and Elyria, I-90 is cosigned with I-80 as part of the turnpike.

The Ohio Turnpike does not pass directly into any major city, but does provide access to the four major metro areas in northern Ohio through connected routes. Two auxiliary Interstate highways, I-271 near Cleveland and I-475 near Toledo, cross the turnpike, but do not have direct connections. In Northwest Ohio, the turnpike passes through the southern part of the Toledo metropolitan area, with direct access to Toledo through I-75 and I-280.

In Northeast Ohio, the turnpike passes through the southern suburbs of Greater Cleveland and the northern edge of the Akron metro area, with direct access to Cleveland via I-71, I-77, I-90 and I-480. Akron is connected to the turnpike via I-77 and State Route 8 (SR 8) in the north and I-76 on the east. The turnpike is located on the western and southern edges of the Mahoning Valley, with direct access to Youngstown through the remaining portion of I-80 east of the Turnpike, and I-680.

In North Jackson, I-80 and I-76 swap each other's right-of-way; I-76 continues east as I-80 and I-80 continues southeast as I-76, carrying the turnpike with it.
In Petersburg, the concurrent routes cross the state lines into Pennsylvania, automatically becoming the Pennsylvania Turnpike.

History 

In 1947 a bill was introduced in the Ohio General Assembly authorizing a privately financed roadway. Originally consisting of a system of five highways, the turnpike was reduced to one when the other four were made redundant by the Federal Aid Highway Act of 1956. Construction for the road cost $326 million and was recorded as the biggest project in state history, with 10,000 employees, more than 2,300 bulldozers, graders, loaders and other machines over a 38-month period.

On December 1, 1954, the first  stretch (the portion lying east of SR 18) opened near the present-day exit 218 for I-76 and I-80. Several motorists attended a dedication ceremony, with over 1,000 people joining a caravan, following a snow plow and a patrol cruiser, to become the first to drive the turnpike. The remaining section from exit 218 west to Indiana opened on October 1, 1955. A connecting ramp near the Indiana state line closed on August 16, 1956, the day before the Indiana Toll Road was opened; this ramp had been used to allow traffic access to US 20 to cross into Indiana.

The turnpike was named after the first chairman of the commission, James W. Shocknessy, in 1976.

Originally, the turnpike offered 18 access points. Additional access points have since been provided, bringing the total number, including the Westgate and Eastgate toll barriers, to 31. Not included in this count is the unnumbered interchange at SR 49, which opened on December 29, 1992. There are no ramp tolls at this interchange; the Westgate toll barrier was, at the same time, moved from its previous location near the Indiana state line to its current location, which is east of SR 49.

In 1996, the turnpike began a project to add one lane in each direction from Toledo to Youngstown. The project, using financing from increased tolls, was originally projected to be finished in 2005, but was not completed until the end of the 2014 construction season.

In 1998, the Ohio Turnpike Commission began phasing in distance-based exit numbers; the sequential numbering system was retired in September 2002. In 2009, the Ohio Turnpike Commission began accepting E-ZPass for toll payment at all plazas, and added gates to toll lanes to prevent motorists from evading tolls.

Ken Blackwell, the defeated candidate in the 2006 Ohio governor's race, had announced a plan for privatizing the turnpike, similar to plans enacted in Illinois and Indiana. In 2010 and 2011, Governor John Kasich stated that he would consider a turnpike lease, but only during a prosperous economic period. In August 2011, Kasich stated his intention to create a task force to produce a leasing plan and also considered the option of reassigning the maintenance of the highway to the Ohio Department of Transportation (ODOT). Ultimately he decided against both, instead proposing to issue more debt under the renamed Ohio Turnpike and Infrastructure Commission, with cash tolls raised annually over a ten-year period to compensate.

In 2021, the Turnpike Commission began new construction efforts to improve toll collections and modernize service plazas. Upgrades at the plazas will include alternate food vendors and the addition of electric vehicle charging stations. The big result will be the addition of new toll plazas that will allow E-ZPass users to use open road tolling, traveling through them at speeds up to 75 mph, paying their tolls without stopping. The total of toll plazas will be decreased by seven, from the current 31 to 24 with a cost savings of over $257 million over 30 years. The new system will be operational in the spring of 2023.

Speed limits 
The Ohio Turnpike opened on October 1, 1955, with a  limit for cars and  limit for trucks. Due to the National Maximum Speed Law, a 55 mph speed limit took effect in 1974 for all vehicles. The 55 mph limit remained until 1987 when the Ohio General Assembly adopted the federally permitted 65 mph maximum speed limit, but for automobiles only.

Governor Taft asked the Ohio Turnpike Commission to work with ODOT and the OSHP to formulate a plan to encourage truck traffic to use the turnpike instead of parallel highways, improving the safety of those other roadways. The three organizations created a plan with three points. Enforcement of truck weight and speed limits on parallel highways was increased, and truck toll rates were lowered in a trial. The speed limit increase took effect on September 8, 2004.

The Ohio Turnpike has had uniform limits for all vehicles since 2004. On December 20, 2010, the Ohio Turnpike Commission voted to increase the speed limit of the Ohio Turnpike to 70 mph. Despite opposition from the Ohio Trucking Association, the increase was approved by the Commission by a vote of 4–1 and went into effect on April 1, 2011.

Services 

The Ohio Turnpike has had service plazas since its inception. Service plazas differ from typical freeway rest areas in that they offer amenities such as 24-hour food and fuel service; motorists do not have to pass through toll booths to re-fuel, use the restroom, or eat.

In 1998, The Ohio Turnpike Commission began modernizing its service plazas, first demolishing the original plazas and then reconstructing them from the ground up. In addition to modern restrooms, the new plazas offer several fast food choices, which vary between the plazas. They also include ATMs, gift shops, travel information counters, Wi-Fi internet access, and facilities for truck drivers, including shower facilities, lounge, and laundry areas. Sunoco fuel stations are provided at all service plazas along the Ohio Turnpike. The company signed a new contract to operate all 16 plazas on the Ohio Turnpike beginning in 2012. Facilities for overnight RV campers are provided at the service plazas located at mile markers 20, 76, 139, and 197.

Service plazas are located in pairs (one for each side of the turnpike) near mile markers 20, 76, 100, 139, 170, 197, and 237. The service plazas located at mile marker 49 were demolished in 2011 and were not rebuilt.

The service plazas located in Lucas County west of Toledo at mile marker 49 were the least utilized. The Ohio Turnpike Commission eventually demolished them, and plans construction of new plazas between mile markers 20 and 49; the new facility will most likely be located in Fulton County and is expected to open after 2012. Due to the lack of a municipal water/sewer system, the service plazas located near mile marker 20 in Williams County were demolished in 2006, though they were eventually rebuilt and reopened on June 29, 2011. The plazas at mile 237 reopened in 2013. As of May 2022, a toll plaza is under construction at milepost 49 in Lucas County where the service plaza used to be, and it will be the first toll plaza on the turnpike to have highway-speed E-ZPass lanes.

Since the turnpike opened, the Ohio Turnpike Commission has contracted with the Ohio State Highway Patrol (OSHP) District 10 to provide law enforcement, as well as assistance to disabled or stranded motorists. The Patrol is the only law enforcement agency with jurisdiction on the turnpike. It monitors Citizen's Band channel 9 for distress calls.

Tolls 

Tolls are based upon the distance traveled, as well as the height and axle-count of vehicle driven. , the toll for a 2-axle vehicle or a motorcycle to travel the entire turnpike is $14.00 for E-ZPass holders and $20.50 for non E-ZPass holders. For purposes of toll calculation, as these barriers are not actually exits, the Westgate toll barrier is counted as exit 2 and the Eastgate toll barrier is counted as exit 239 on toll tickets.

The Ohio Turnpike Commission had been hesitant to deploy an electronic tolling system, citing an apparent lack of commuter travel as well as significant implementation expenses. In December 2006, the commission indicated their intention to move forward with the implementation of an E-ZPass-compatible system as a "customer convenience". The system was activated on October 1, 2009. In 2009, the turnpike became the first publicly owned toll facility in the U.S.—and the second overall—to allow users to pay tolls with a debit or credit card.

In April 2008, Governor Ted Strickland and legislative leaders announced a planned stimulus package that would redistribute Turnpike tolls to road projects throughout the state.  On May 23, the Ohio Senate Finance Committee voted to pass a new version of the package which would not involve tolls collected.

Two other mainline barriers are being built, and tolls will cease to be collected at exits between each respective new barrier and the nearest existing toll plaza; completion is planned for 2023.

In 2022, with 89% of all commercial trucks using the E-ZPass System, the OTIC began the largest building program on the toll road since its original opening in 1955. The $232 million effort will renovate 20 interchanges and enable more use of E-ZPass. It will also eliminate seven toll plazas and is projected to save $257 million over the next 30 years. The work also involves lane conversions, elimination of toll gates at plaza interchanges as well as new tolling readers featured in four mainline plazas that provide E-ZPass open road tolling. The construction also features new patron dynamic message signs that will—at eye level—provide drivers with dynamic messaging.

Exit list 
Until 1998, the turnpike numbered exits sequentially, but afterwards started the process of renumbering them by the milepost system. This was done to "alleviate confusion from the irregular sequence of numerical references" due to recently added interchanges as well as to conform to federal standards. The conversion ran from January 1998 to September 2002 with dually posted numbers during that period.

See also 

 Illinois State Toll Highway Authority
 New Jersey Turnpike
 New York State Thruway

Notes

References

External links 

 Official site

Freeways in the United States
Interstate 76 (Ohio–New Jersey)
Interstate 80
Interstate 90
Toll roads in Ohio
Tolled sections of Interstate Highways
Transportation in Williams County, Ohio
Transportation in Fulton County, Ohio
Transportation in Lucas County, Ohio
Transportation in Wood County, Ohio
Transportation in Ottawa County, Ohio
Transportation in Sandusky County, Ohio
Transportation in Erie County, Ohio
Transportation in Lorain County, Ohio
Transportation in Cuyahoga County, Ohio
Transportation in Summit County, Ohio
Transportation in Portage County, Ohio
Transportation in Trumbull County, Ohio
Transportation in Mahoning County, Ohio